The Macchi M.8 was an Italian reconnaissance/bomber flying boat designed by Alessandro Tonini and built by Macchi. It was used by the Italian Naval Aviation and was later flown by crews from the United States Navy.

Design and development
The M.8 was similar to earlier flying boat designs from the company but introduced new rigid wing bracing (or interplane struts). The hull was improved from earlier designs and the tail unit was similar to that developed for the M.7. It was a biplane flying boat with the pilot and co-pilot in a side-by-side open cockpit with a further open cockpit forward of them for an observer. The third cockpit was fitted with a machine gun ring and there was access inside the hull between the cockpits. The M.8 was powered by a single Isotta-Fraschini V.4B pusher engine mounted below the upper wing.

A total of 57 aircraft were built between 1917 and 1918 and were used for coastal reconnaissance and to attack enemy submarines. After World War I, a number of surviving aircraft were used at seaplane flying schools for instruction.

Operators

 Corpo Aeronautico Militare

 Swedish Navy

 United States Navy

Specifications (Macchi M.8)

See also

References

 
 

1910s Italian military reconnaissance aircraft
Flying boats
M.08
Biplanes
Single-engined pusher aircraft
Aircraft first flown in 1917